Bishnu Prasad Paudel is a Nepalese politician, who is the vice-chairman of Communist Party of Nepal (Unified Marxist–Leninist). Paudel served as the Deputy Prime Minister and Minister of Finance in the Third Dahal cabinet.
He has earlier served as Deputy Prime Minister (2021), and headed other prominent Ministries such as Finance (2020-2021, 2015-2016), Home Affairs (2021), Industry (2021), Water (2021, 2008-2009, 1994-1999) and Defence (2011).

He is a member of the House of Representatives elected from Rupandehi district, Parliamentary Constituency 2, in the election of the Federal Parliament held in 2017. He won the election with a huge margin of 22,000 votes at that time. During the second Constituent Assembly Election in 2013, he defeated the former prime minister Baburam Bhattarai from Rupendehi 4.

Paudel previously successfully served as the Minister of Finance from 5 November 2015 to 1 August 2016 in the first cabinet of prime minister KP Sharma Oli. He also served as Minister of Defence from 6 February 2011 to 29 August 2011, under prime minister Jhala Nath Khanal and as the Minister for Water Resources from 18 August 2008 to 25 May 2009 under prime minister Pushpa Kamal Dahal. He has also served as the Minister for Youth, Sports and Culture in 1997 under prime minister Lokendra Bahadur Chand.

Early life
Bishnu Prasad Paudel was born to Devilal Paudel and Devaki Paudel on 20 November 1959 in Syangja Nepal. He joined politics in 1976. During the Panchayat System in Nepal, he faced jail time. 
In 1977, he passed the SLC examination and moved to Rupendehi from Syangja to start the career as a Primary School teacher and he influenced by the communist activists. He resigned from the teaching profession and joined the Communist Party at the age of 18. Paudel broke the Bhairahawa Jail and went back to people's movement. Paudel was taken to Bhairahawa jail with three thousand rupees fine in charge of state of affairs after facing the case for 3 years. He revolted in the jail after 45 days comprehensive preparation.

Political life
 Chief, Organization Department Communist Party of Nepal (UML) since April 2021
 General Secretary, Communist Party of Nepal (NCP) since 2018
 Deputy General Secretary, Communist Party of Nepal (UML), 2014 - 2018
 Secretary of Central Committee, Communist Party of  Nepal (UML), 2009 - 2014
 Member of  Standing Committee, Communist Party of Nepal (UML), 2003 - 2019
 Member of Central Committee, Communist Party of Nepal (UML) Since 1990
 Party Member of CPN (ML/UML) since 1977

Electoral history

Paudel is a five time parliamentarian. He is one of the influential leader of Nepal Communist Party (UML). Currently, he is working as the Minister of Finance of the Government of Nepal. This is his third term as finance minister. He was elected from Palpa in the mid-term elections of 2051 and since then he has been contesting from Rupandehi in all the 5 elections. In which he was elected 4 times and was defeated once in 2056.He is among the very few leaders who have been elected many times in the elections of both the party and parliament under the leadership of CPN-UML. He was an elected member in the 2nd Constituent Assembly from Rupandehi when he competed against former Prime Minister Baburam Bhattarai who came third. He won for fifth time from the Rupandehi 2 in 2022.

1994 Pratinidhi Sabha Election Palpa-3

1999 Pratinidhi Sabha Election Rupendehi-3

2008 Constituent Assembly Election Rupandehi-4

2013 Constituent Assembly Election Rupandehi-4

2017 Pratinidhi Sabha Election Rupandehi-2

2022 Pratinidhi Sabha Election Rupandehi-2

References

Living people
1959 births
Nepal Communist Party (NCP) politicians
Finance ministers of Nepal
Nepal MPs 2017–2022
Nepal MPs 1994–1999
People from Syangja District
Deputy Prime Ministers of Nepal

Members of the 1st Nepalese Constituent Assembly
Members of the 2nd Nepalese Constituent Assembly
Communist Party of Nepal (Unified Marxist–Leninist) politicians
Nepal MPs 2022–present